José Nicolas Tábata (born August 12, 1988) is a Venezuelan professional baseball outfielder who is a free agent. He was an international signee (2005) of the New York Yankees and, by 2008, became the Yankees' No. 2 prospect. He played in Major League Baseball (MLB) for the Pittsburgh Pirates from 2010 through 2015.

Career

New York Yankees
At the age of 17, and in his first year of professional ball, Tábata led the Yankees farm system in batting average when he hit .314 for the Gulf Coast Yankees in 2005.

In 2006, Tábata batted .298 for the Low A Charleston RiverDogs. The same year, he was selected to participate in the XM Satellite Radio All-Star Futures Game as a member of the World Team, which consisted of 25 highly touted prospects from across the globe. In the game, which was part of the festivities for the 2006 All-Star Game at PNC Park in Pittsburgh, Pennsylvania, he played center field while going 1-for-3 with a single off fellow Yankees prospect Phil Hughes.

In 2007, Tábata played for the Single-A Tampa Yankees.

Pittsburgh Pirates
On July 26, 2008, Tábata was acquired by the Pirates with Ross Ohlendorf, Jeff Karstens, and Daniel McCutchen from the Yankees in exchange for Xavier Nady and Dámaso Marte.

Tábata was called up from Triple-A Indianapolis to make his major league debut on June 9, 2010. He subsequently singled for his first major league hit in his first at bat. In the top of the fourth, with Neil Walker at bat, Tábata collected the first stolen base of his career. He then tallied his first run of his career, on a single from Walker on the next pitch.

In 2010, he batted .299, and led National League left fielders in range factor/game (2.09). He tied for 8th in the voting for NL Rookie of the Year, behind Ike Davis of the New York Mets.

On August 21, 2011, Pirates general manager Neal Huntington announced a contract extension for Tábata through 2019. Tábata signed with the Pirates through 2016 for $14.75 million guaranteed, with a $250,000 buyout, and an additional three club option years for 2017–2019. On July 2, 2012, Tábata was sent down to the Pirates' AAA affiliate Indianapolis Indians. Tabata was recalled on August 19, 2012, when Starling Marte was placed on the Disabled list. Tábata started the 2013 season off well. On May 25, 2013, Tábata was placed on the 15-day disabled list. Tábata was batting .272, with two home runs, six RBIs, and a .744 OPS in just 36 games with the Pirates. Tábata's .744 OPS was just two points off of his career high OPS which is .746. Tábata finished up the 2013 season with 6 homers, a career best.

Tábata was outrighted off the Pirates roster on June 24, 2014. He was re-added to the roster on August 25, 2014. He was designated for assignment on October 3, 2014. He was called back up by the Pirates on May 19, 2015.

On June 20, 2015, Tábata faced Max Scherzer in the ninth inning, after Scherzer had retired the first 26 batters in order for the Washington Nationals. On a 2–2 count, a pitch inside clipped Tábata on the elbow guard, ending Scherzer's chance for a perfect game. After Tábata took first base, Scherzer induced a fly ball from the next batter that was caught by Michael A. Taylor, preserving a no-hitter for Scherzer. Tábata faced criticism from numerous baseball fans and analysts after the game for leaning into the pitch, although he said afterward he had expected Scherzer's slider to break back toward the plate. Replays confirmed that Tabata moved his elbow guard, with purpose, down towards the ball. Scherzer, to his credit, said he did not blame Tábata for breaking up the perfect game, adding, "I probably would have done the same thing."

Los Angeles Dodgers
On July 31, 2015, Tábata was traded to the Los Angeles Dodgers in exchange for Michael Morse. He was assigned to the AAA Oklahoma City Dodgers, where he hit .225 in 28 games in 2015 and .244 in 30 games in 2016. Tabata was released by the Dodgers on June 11, 2016.

Tigres de Quintana Roo
On June 30, 2016, Tabata signed with the Tigres de Quintana Roo of the Mexican Baseball League. He hit .320 in 123 plate appearances in Mexico.

Toronto Blue Jays
Tábata signed a minor league contract with the Toronto Blue Jays on February 10, 2017. He spent the entire 2017 season on the disabled list with the Buffalo Bisons, and elected free agency on November 7.

York Revolution
On February 21, 2018, Tábata signed with the York Revolution of the Atlantic League of Professional Baseball. He was released on June 8, 2018.

Guerreros de Oaxaca
On July 3, 2018, Tabata signed with the Guerreros de Oaxaca of the Mexican League. He was released on July 10, 2018.

West Virginia Power
On May 26, 2021, Tábata signed with the West Virginia Power of the Atlantic League of Professional Baseball. In 29 games, he slashed .354/.433/.585 with 4 home runs and 18 RBIs.

Sultanes de Monterrey
On July 8, 2021, Tábata's contract was purchased by the Sultanes de Monterrey of the Mexican League. In 11 games, he slashed .387/.486/.710 with 2 home runs and 4 RBIs. Tábata was released on August 4, 2021.

Personal
On March 23, 2009, Tábata's wife, Amalia Tábata Pereira, who is 23 years his senior, was arrested and charged with abduction after allegedly kidnapping a two-month-old girl in Florida by posing as an immigration officer; the baby was found unharmed in a shopping center later the same day. Tábata told the media that Pereira, whom he married in January 2008, had told him that she had given birth and that the baby was his. They divorced in early 2010.

Tábata married his second wife, Auromar, in early 2011, and the couple have a daughter, Barbara (born September 29, 2011).

See also
 List of Major League Baseball players from Venezuela

References

External links

1988 births
Altoona Curve players
Bradenton Marauders players
Caribes de Anzoátegui players
Caribes de Oriente players
Charleston RiverDogs players
Gulf Coast Pirates players
Gulf Coast Yankees players
Indianapolis Indians players
Living people
Major League Baseball outfielders
Major League Baseball players from Venezuela
Mexican League baseball left fielders
Oklahoma City Dodgers players
People from Anzoátegui
Pittsburgh Pirates players
Scottsdale Scorpions players
Sultanes de Monterrey players
Tampa Yankees players
Trenton Thunder players
Tigres de Quintana Roo players
Venezuelan expatriate baseball players in Mexico
Venezuelan expatriate baseball players in the United States
West Virginia Power players
York Revolution players